Notiodella is an extinct conodont genus in the family Balognathidae. It has been described from a 17-element apparatus from the Soom Shale Lagerstätte (Upper Ordovician) in South Africa.

References

External links 

Prioniodontida genera
Ordovician animals of Africa
Ordovician conodonts
Soom Shale fossils